The Black Legion, officially the 1st Standing Active Brigade (Prvi stajaći djelatni sdrug), was an Ustaše militia infantry unit active during World War II in Independent State of Croatia. The legion was formed in September 1941 as the 1st Ustaša Regiment. It consisted largely of Bosnian Muslim and Croat refugees from eastern Bosnia, where large massacres were carried out by Chetniks and to a small degree by the Yugoslav Partisans. It became known for its fierce fighting against the Chetniks and the Partisans and massacres against Serb civilians. The legion's commanders were Colonel Jure Francetić and Major Rafael Boban. It consisted of between 1,000 and 1,500 trained mechanized infantrymen.

History
The Black Legion was formed in Sarajevo in April 1941 with 12 founding members, of whom 11 were Croats and one was a Bosnian Muslim. The force grew to be predominantly Muslim in response to the atrocities carried out against Bosnian Muslims. Its first official name was ″Sarajevo Ustaše Camp″. The unit was formed by pre-war Ustaše members, Jozo Zubić, Drago Jilek and Bećir Lokmić. The unit commander was Lokmić stationed in Sarajevo before the war. The unit's first task was guarding state buildings in Sarajevo.

Its first armed conflict occurred on the railway in Pale, Sarajevo, against Chetniks who wanted to take over the water supply. Soon, they entered conflict with Chetniks on the wider area of Sarajevo, under mountains Igman, Trebević and Romanija. After the battle of Kupres, the Legion's 1st and 2nd battalion were used to form the cadre for the newly formed 5th Standing Active Brigade which was put under the command of Rafael Boban and incorporated into the 5th division of the Croatian Armed Forces in December 1944.

In August 1942, Francetić was appointed the supreme commander of all standing active brigades of the Ustaše Army and the Legion's new commander became Colonel Ivo Stipković. Under Stipković's command the Legion lost even more men when the 23rd and 28th battalions (composed mainly of Bosnian Muslims) were disbanded	and their soldiers transferred to the 13th Waffen Mountain Division of the SS Handschar. After the death of Colonel Stipković in September 1943 the Legion's commander became Major Milan Šulentić but just eight days later he was replaced by Major Franjo Sudar. Near the end of 1944 the Legion was incorporated into the 1st division of the Croatian Armed Forces under the command of General Roman Domanik. Soldiers of the Black Legion continued to wear the black uniform right up to the end of the war, probably as a sort of honorary mark of distinction. Lastly, at least 120 former Black Legion men were executed by the Partisans at Sisak in May 1945. When the war ended, many soldiers of the Black Legion refused to surrender and joined the Crusaders.

Notes

References

External links 
 Black Legion: Croatian Nazi atrocities during Holocaust Era 

Ustaša Militia